Velveteen (or velveret) is a type of cloth made to imitate velvet, which is a type of pile fabric. Normally cotton, the term is sometimes applied to a mixture of silk and cotton. Some velveteens are a kind of fustian, having a rib of velvet pile alternating with a plain depression. This fabric has a pile that is short (never more than 3 mm deep) and is closely set. It has a firm hand and a slightly sloping pile. Compared to true velvet, velveteen has greater body, does not drape as easily, and has less sheen.

Historically, the velveteen trade varied with the fashions that controlled the production of velvet.

See also
The Velveteen Rabbit
Velour

References

External links

Pile fabrics

es:Pana